Clavipalpula is a genus of moths of the family Noctuidae.

Species
Clavipalpula alboradiata Köhler, 1947
Clavipalpula aurariae (Oberthür, 1880)

References
Natural History Museum Lepidoptera genus database

Hadeninae